The canton of Saint-Laurent-en-Grandvaux is an administrative division of the Jura department, eastern France. Its borders were modified at the French canton reorganisation which came into effect in March 2015. Its seat is in Saint-Laurent-en-Grandvaux.

It consists of the following communes:
 
Arsure-Arsurette
Barésia-sur-l'Ain
Bief-des-Maisons
Bief-du-Fourg
Billecul
Boissia
Bonlieu
Censeau
Cerniébaud
Les Chalesmes
Charcier
Charency
Charézier
La Chaumusse
Chaux-des-Crotenay
La Chaux-du-Dombief
Chevrotaine
Clairvaux-les-Lacs
Cogna
Conte
Crans
Cuvier
Denezières
Doucier
Doye
Entre-deux-Monts
Esserval-Tartre
La Favière
Foncine-le-Bas
Foncine-le-Haut
Fontenu
Fort-du-Plasne
Fraroz
La Frasnée
Le Frasnois
Gillois
Grande-Rivière Château
Hautecour
Lac-des-Rouges-Truites
Largillay-Marsonnay
La Latette
Longcochon
Marigny
Menétrux-en-Joux
Mesnois
Mièges
Mignovillard
Mournans-Charbonny
Nozeroy
Onglières
Patornay
Les Planches-en-Montagne
Plénise
Plénisette
Pont-de-Poitte
Rix
Saffloz
Saint-Laurent-en-Grandvaux
Saint-Maurice-Crillat
Saint-Pierre
Saugeot
Songeson
Soucia
Thoiria
Uxelles
Vertamboz

References

Cantons of Jura (department)